The 1903 San Diego mayoral election was held on April 7, 1903 to elect the mayor for San Diego. Incumbent Mayor Frank P. Frary was reelected to a second term with a plurality of the votes.

Candidates
Frank P. Frary, Mayor of San Diego
James E. Wadham
Frank Simpson

Campaign
Incumbent Mayor Frank P. Frary, a Republican, stood for reelection to a second two-year term. His reelection was contested by James E. Wadham, a Democrat, and Frank Simpson, a Socialist. Wadham ran on a Democratic Party platform that advocated for public ownership of gas and electricity as well as the development of pueblo lands.

On April 7, 1903, Frary was reelected mayor with a plurality of 49.0 percent of the vote. Wadham came in second with 43.7 percent of the vote. This represented an 8.4 percent swing in the Democrat's favor compared to 1901, but was not enough to defeat Frary. Simpson came in third with 7.3 percent.

Election results

References

1903
1903 United States mayoral elections
1903 California elections
1903
April 1903 events